Shun (written: , , , , ,  or ) is a masculine Japanese given name. Notable people with the name include:

, Japanese gymnast
, Japanese footballer
, Japanese general
, Japanese professional baseball infielder 
, Japanese voice actor 
, Japanese gymnast
, Japanese writer
, Japanese footballer
, Japanese footballer
, Japanese film director
, Japanese video game designer
, Japanese footballer
, Japanese footballer
, Japanese actor, voice actor and film director
, Japanese figure skater
, Japanese footballer
, Japanese actor
, Japanese baseball player
, Japanese baseball player
, Japanese actor and voice actor

Fictional characters
Shun Aonuma, a character from the novel and anime series From the New World
Shun, a support character in the Japanese RPG Ar Tonelico II
Shun Di, a fictional Drunken Kung Fu Master in Virtua Fighter Series
Andromeda Shun, a main character in the anime series Saint Seiya
Shun Ibusaki, a character in the manga series Shokugeki no Soma
Shun Izuki, a character in the manga series Kuroko no Basuke
Shun Kaidou, a character in the manga series Saiki Kusuo no Sai-nan
Shun Kazama, a main character in the Studio Ghibli film From Up on Poppy Hill
Shun Kazami, a character in the anime series Bakugan
Shun Kenzaki, A Character from the Youthbe Series Origin, portrayed by Sen Mitsuji
Shun Namiki, a character in the sentai series Denji Sentai Megaranger
Shun Nitta, a character in the anime series Captain Tsubasa
Shun Hashimoto, a main character in the family BL manga series L'étranger

Japanese masculine given names